Kafsokalyvia is a settlement and idiorrhythmic skete in Mount Athos. It is located at the southern edge of the Athos peninsula. Kafsokalyvia is named after Maximos Kausokalybites ("Maximos the Hut Burner"), a 14th-century Christian hermit.

It is also known as the Holy Trinity Skete.

There are 40 cells in Kafsokalyvia, not all of which are occupied. There are 35 monks living at Kafsokalyvia (Speake 2014).

A regular ferry service connects the port of Kafsokalyvia with Dafni, the main port of Mount Athos.

List of cells
List of cells and other buildings in Kafsokalyvia:

Notable people
Notable monks who have lived at Kafsokalyvia include:

Maximos of Kafsokalyvia
Niphon of Kafsokalyvia
Akakios the Younger
Porphyrios of Kafsokalyvia
Hadji-Georgis the Athonite

References

Populated places in Mount Athos
Sketes in Mount Athos
Great Lavra